Ruhollah Ahmadzadeh (born 2 January 1979 in Qom) is an Iranian conservative politician.

Biography
He was governor of Fars Province. 
He was appointed Head of Cultural Heritage and Tourism Organization on 19 May 2011, by Mahmoud Ahmadinejad. He resigned on 4 January 2012.

References

Heads of Cultural Heritage, Handicrafts and Tourism Organization
Living people
1956 births
Imam Sadiq University alumni